A gubernatorial election was held on 11 April 1999 to elect the Governor of Saga Prefecture. Incumbent Isamu Imoto was re-elected.

Candidates
Isamu Imoto - incumbent Governor of Saga Prefecture, age 73
 - former prefectural party chairman, age 67

Results

References

Saga gubernatorial elections
1999 elections in Japan